Olle Ragnar B. Ekberg (12 August 1886, in Stockholm – 5 April 1966, in Saltsjöbaden, Sweden) was a Swedish track and field athlete who competed in the 1908 Summer Olympics and in the 1912 Summer Olympics.

In 1908, he finished fifth in the standing long jump competition. Four years later he finished 13th in the standing long jump event. He also participated in the 100 metres competition but was eliminated in the first round.

References

External links
Profile

1886 births
1966 deaths
Swedish male sprinters
Swedish male long jumpers
Olympic athletes of Sweden
Athletes (track and field) at the 1908 Summer Olympics
Athletes (track and field) at the 1912 Summer Olympics
Athletes from Stockholm
20th-century Swedish people